The Torre del Agua  is a  tower built at the Expo 2008 site in Zaragoza, Spain.

Seen from above, the structure has a droplet-of-water shape. It consists of a transparent glass design and includes a big three-storey basement. It provides 10,400 accessible square metres,  in the basement's floor and the remainder divided between the ramps and flat lands inside the glass tower. There is a  panoramic bar in the uppermost floor with views over the exposition site and the city. 

During Expo 2008, the building hosted the Water for Life exposition. 

After the Expo, it was acquired by Caja de Ahorros de la Inmaculada (CAI). On 3 August 2013, it was reopened to the public.

References

External links

Water Tower at Expo Zaragoza 2008 website

Towers completed in 2008
Buildings and structures in Zaragoza
World's fair architecture in Zaragoza